Tedstone Wafer is a village and civil parish  north east of Hereford, in the county of Herefordshire, England. In 2011 the parish had a population of 112. The parish touches Collington, Edvin Loach and Saltmarshe, Lower Sapey, Norton, Tedstone Delamere and Wolferlow. Tedstone Wafer shares a parish council with Edvin Loach and Saltmarshe, Tedstone Delamere, Upper Sapey and Wolferlow called "North Bromyard Group Parish Council".

Landmarks 
There are 9 listed buildings in Tedstone Wafer. Tedstone Wafer has a church called St James that was formerly called St Mary and a village hall.

History 
The name "Tedstone" means 'Teod(i)'s thorn-tree', the "Wafer" part being that Robert le Wafre held land here in 1160-70. Tedstone Wafer was recorded in the Domesday Book as Tedesthorne/Tetistorp along with Tedstone Delamere.

References

External links 

 

Villages in Herefordshire
Civil parishes in Herefordshire